Thomas Rådström (born 22 January 1966), nicknamed "Rådis", is a rally and rallycross driver from Sweden.

Career 
Rådström was one of the leading drivers of the National Swedish Rallycross Championship series during the second half of the 1980s. He then started rallying and competed in the World Rally Championship for nine consecutive years during 1994–2002, and returned in 2006.

He won the Swedish Rally Championship in 1996, and his most significant international successes have been in his home event, the Swedish Rally, which he won in 1994 when the event was not part of the WRC schedule. This was the first of four podiums and seven top ten finishes in nine attempts at this event.

Rådström was a Toyota works driver from 1991–98, before switching to Ford for a season, competing as the team's star signing Colin McRae's gravel and snow event wingman in the debut season of the Ford Focus WRC. He returned to Toyota in 2000, and from 2001–02 was employed by the then Championship newcomers, Citroën, with the exception of one outing in the Group A Lancer Evolution for Mitsubishi Ralliart at the 2001 Swedish Rally, where he finished second. He scored another podium, now aboard the Xsara WRC, in 2002: a third place on the gruelling Safari Rally, on his team's first visit to the event.

Between 2003 and 2007, Rådström drove a 500+bhp strong Hyundai Accent T16 4x4 in both, the Swedish Rallycross Championship (4th overall in 2006 as well as in 2007) and in the FIA European Rallycross Championship. His plans to continue driving Rallycross with a Hyundai i30 T16 4x4 were paused due to economical reasons.

Complete WRC results

External links

Official website
Driver profile, Rallybase.nl website

1966 births
World Rally Championship drivers
Swedish rally drivers
Living people
Citroën Racing drivers
Toyota Gazoo Racing drivers